Hayden McCormick (born 1 January 1994 in Cambridge, New Zealand) is a New Zealand cyclist, who currently rides for UCI Continental team .

Major results

2012
 1st  Criterium, National Road Championships
 1st  Overall Trophée Centre Morbihan
1st  Points classification
1st Stage 1
 1st Stage 1 Tour of Canterbury
2014
 1st  Road race, National Under-23 Road Championships
 3rd Tour of Southland
 9th Overall New Zealand Cycle Classic
2015
 3rd Road race, National Under-23 Road Championships
 9th Overall Tour de Berlin
 10th Liège–Bastogne–Liège U23
2016
 National Under-23 Road Championships
1st  Time trial
2nd Road race
 1st Stage 1 (TTT) Ronde van Midden-Nederland
 8th Rutland–Melton CiCLE Classic
2017
 2nd Rutland–Melton CiCLE Classic
 5th Overall Ronde van Midden-Nederland
1st Stage 1 (TTT)
 9th Velothon Wales
2018
 1st  Overall New Zealand Cycle Classic
 2nd Road race, National Road Championships
 3rd Gravel and Tar
 5th Road race, Commonwealth Games
 10th Overall Tour of Małopolska
2019
 1st  Mountains classification Tour of Utah
 3rd Time trial, National Road Championships
 4th Overall Tour of China I
 5th Overall Tour of China II
2020
 1st Gravel and Tar
 4th Overall New Zealand Cycle Classic
2021
 1st Tuatara 1000
 7th Gravel and Tar Classic

References

External links

1994 births
Living people
New Zealand male cyclists
Sportspeople from Cambridge, New Zealand
Cyclists at the 2018 Commonwealth Games
Commonwealth Games competitors for New Zealand